John Brown (1805–1876) was a 19th-century architect working in Norwich, in the county of Norfolk, England. His buildings include churches and workhouses.

Life

He was the pupil of the architect William Brown of Ipswich, a close relative. He was, along with his two sons, the surveyor for Norwich Cathedral, where his work there included a restoration of the crossing tower, undertaken during the 1830s. He was appointed county surveyor for Norfolk in 1835.

Works
Brown's works include:
St Peter: Lowestoft, Suffolk; built 1833; white brick with no tower, Carpenter's Gothic style; demolished circa 1974
St Michael's (St Michael the Greater): Stamford, Lincolnshire; built 1835–36; Early English style; by 2002 no longer used as a church
Sudbury workhouse: Sudbury, Suffolk; built 1836(–37?) after enactment of the Poor Law Amendment Act 1834.
The Norwich Yarn Factory (St James Mill): Norwich; built 1836–37.
Workhouse at  Lingwood, Norfolk; built 1837. Later called "Homelea". and since demolished. 
Workhouse at Great Yarmouth, Norfolk; built 1838. Later the Northgate Hospital. Described by Nikolaus Pevsner as "Red brick and still classical in its proportions and its details".
All Saints, Hainford, Norfolk; 1838–40. Flint with red brick dressings; lancet windows.
Christ Church: East Greenwich in south-east London; built 1847–49; Robert Kerr, co-architect
St Margaret: Lee, London; built 1839–41
Christchurch: New Catton, Norwich; built 1841.
St Mark: New Lakenham, Norwich; built 1844; modified perpendicular style.
St Matthew: Thorpe Hamlet, Norwich; built 1851; Neo-Norman style; Robert Kerr, co-architect; by 2002 offices.
The Old Corn Exchange: Fakenham, Norfolk; built 1855; by 2002 a cinema.
St Peter & St Paul Bergh Apton, Norfolk; 1838. Major internal re-ordering for Revd John Thomas Pelham.

References

Sources

19th-century English architects
Architects from Norwich
1805 births
1876 deaths
English ecclesiastical architects